The Tomaquag Rock Shelters (RI-HP-1) are a prehistoric rockshelter site off Maxson Hill Road (formerly Burdickville Road) in Hopkinton, Rhode Island.  The shelters are located under two east-facing granite outcrops in the valley drained by Tomaquag Brook.  First discovered in the late 1950s by Nathan Kaye, materials recovered from test excavations resulted in the dating the occupation of one shelter to 800 BCE and the other to 800 CE.  Materials recovered include projectile points, stone knives, and evidence of stone tool construction.  Both sites included evidence pointing to the presence of a fire pit.

The shelters were added to the National Register of Historic Places in 1977.

In 1982 Nathan Kaye gave the shelters to the State of Rhode Island. In 1996 the State Properties Committee entered into a "Park Use Agreement" with the Town of Hopkinton to preserve the shelter site. The Hopkinton Planning Board entered a requirement that the cultural aspects of the shelter be protected in a Master Plan agreement with the developers of a proposed solar farm across the road from the site on January 4, 2019.

See also
National Register of Historic Places listings in Washington County, Rhode Island

References

Archaeological sites on the National Register of Historic Places in Rhode Island
Rock shelters in the United States
Hopkinton, Rhode Island
National Register of Historic Places in Washington County, Rhode Island